Nico Lathouris is an Australian-born actor and writer of Greek descent.

Life and career
Lathouris has worked on the television series Police Rescue. He appeared in George Miller's film Mad Max (1979) as a car mechanic. He also ran film and drama workshops for the Australian Film Commission.

Lathouris is best known for the role of George Poulos in Heartbreak High, as well as being the series drama coach responsible for developing the skills of the younger actors and actresses who starred in the series. He helped to develop realistic characters from a whole variety of ethnic backgrounds. The series marked a big shift in the way that life in Australia is represented in TV drama. In the past, many shows had not reflected all the different cultures which exist side-by-side in Australia's big cities, and Heartbreak High broke the mould by acknowledging and celebrating the country's cultural mix.

Lathouris is co-screenwriter (alongside George Miller) of Mad Max: Fury Road (2015).

Selected filmography
Journey Among Women (1977) - Soldier
Mad Max (1979) - Grease Rat
Desolation Angels (1982) - Nightman
Where the Green Ants Dream (1984) - Arnold
The Young Wife (1984, TV Movie) - Yannis
Wrong World (1985) - Rangott
Rikky and Pete (1988) - Con Ionides
Georgia (1988) - Bystander #2
Belinda (1988) - Benny Rose
Against the Innocent (1989) - Tim McKenzie
Father (1990) - Amos
Death in Brunswick (1990) - Mustafa
Heaven Tonight (1990) - Hot dog man
Jigsaw (1990) - Ed Minter
The Heartbreak Kid (1993) - George
Gino (1994) - Rocco Petri
What I Have Written (1996) - Claude Murnane
Serenades (2001) - Mullah Jalal-Shah
Mad Max: Fury Road (2015, Writer)
Furiosa (2024, Writer)

External links

Living people
Australian male television actors
Australian people of Greek descent
Year of birth missing (living people)
Nebula Award winners